Crystal Lake is one of two stations on Metra's Union Pacific Northwest Line located in Crystal Lake, Illinois. A large coach yard is adjacent to the station and has additional storage tracks to store Metra trains overnight, and on holidays and weekends. A Union Pacific maintenance facility and office, some storage tracks for local freight trains and maintenance of way equipment as well as a junction are also located just southeast of here. The branch line to  splits off at this junction. Parking is available at the station. , Crystal Lake is the 36th busiest of the 236 non-downtown stations in the Metra system, with an average of 1,138 weekday boardings.

As of April 25, 2022, Crystal Lake is served by 44 trains (22 in each direction) on weekdays, by 30 trains (15 in each direction) on Saturdays, and by 20 trains (nine inbound, all 11 outbound) on Sundays.

On weekdays, 11 inbound trains originate from Crystal Lake and 10 trains terminate here, with five inbound trains originating and five outbound trains terminating here on Saturdays, and two inbound trains originating and three outbound trains terminating here on Sundays.

Pace connections

 550 Elgin Transportation Center/Crystal Lake 
 806 Crystal Lake/Fox Lake 
 808 Crystal Lake/Harvard

References

External links
- Crystal Lake
Station from Main Street from Google Maps Street View

Metra stations in Illinois
Former Chicago and North Western Railway stations
Crystal Lake, Illinois
Railway stations in the United States opened in 1915
Railway stations in McHenry County, Illinois